Amos Rex is an art museum named after publisher and arts patron  Amos Anderson located in Lasipalatsi, Mannerheimintie, Helsinki, Finland. It opened in 2018 and rapidly reached international popularity, attracting more than 10,000 visitors in a matter of weeks.

History

In 2013, the museum announced plans to build a subterranean annex under the Lasipalatsi plaza, located near the museum's premises on Yrjönkatu. The annex was estimated to cost 50 million euros and to also use facilities above the ground in the Lasipalatsi building. The Helsinki City Board decided to reserve the plot for the museum in December 2013. The funding was provided by the Finnish-Swedish arts foundation Konstsamfundet. The museum plan was unanimously approved by the Helsinki City Council in May 2014 and the new annex was scheduled to open in 2017.

The new annex was designed by JKMM Architects, whose other works include the Turku Main Library and the Finnish pavilion at the 2010 Shanghai World Expo.

The construction of the new museum started in January 2016 and it opened to the public in August 2018.

Exhibitions

 Massless, the first exhibition at the Amos Rex museum, was created by the Japanese collective teamLab. It consisted of a colourful, immersive interactive art exhibition. Viewers were encouraged to interact and explore with the surroundings, generating different visual results.

Amos Anderson Art Museum, 1965-2017 
The Amos Anderson Art Museum is an art museum in Helsinki, Finland. It is the largest private art museum in Finland. The museum is currently situated on Yrjönkatu, with a subterranean annex, known as Amos Rex, built beneath Lasipalatsi.

History

The museum was founded by Amos Anderson, the owner of the Swedish-language Hufvudstadsbladet newspaper and a patron of the arts. In 1913, Anderson commissioned architects W. G. Palmqvist and Einar Sjöström to design a building on Yrjönkatu. The building would function as both Anderson's private living quarters and office space for his businesses. After Anderson's death in 1961, the building was converted into a museum, which opened in 1965. As of early 2019, Luckan, a Konstsamundet financed center for Finland Swedish culture, moved to the Yrjönkatu building previously used by the museum.

Collections and exhibitions
The Amos Anderson Art Museum's collections include primarily 20th-century art, with some of the oldest works originally belonging to Amos Anderson's personal collection. The museum has paintings by Francesco Bassano (Adoration of the Magi), Paul Signac, Louis Valtat, Roger Fry, Alfred Finch (View of Fiesöle), Ragnar Ekelund, Magnus Enckell, Eero Nelimarkka, Tyko Sallinen, Tove Jansson (Fantasy), and the Swedish painter Palm. In its acquisitions, the museum concentrates on contemporary art.

The museum arranges 8–12 exhibitions a year.

See also

 Ateneum
 Helsinki Art Museum
 Kiasma

References

External links

Official website

Buildings and structures completed in 1913
1965 establishments in Finland 
Art museums established in 1965
Museums in Helsinki
Art museums and galleries in Finland
Anderson, Amos
Kamppi